Super Handling-All Wheel Drive (SH-AWD) is a full-time, fully automatic, all-wheel drive traction and handling system, combining front-rear torque distribution control with independently regulated torque distribution to the left and right rear wheels, to freely distribute the optimum amount of torque to all four wheels in accordance with driving conditions." The system was announced in April 2004, and first introduced in the North American market in the second generation 2005 model year Acura RL, and in Japan as the fourth generation Honda Legend.

As first implemented in the Acura RL, SH-AWD allows torque to be continuously distributed between front and rear wheels from 70% front/30% rear to 30% front/70% rear, with up to 100% of the rear power being distributed to the outer left or right wheel to assist in cornering and dramatically reducing understeer. For example, in straight-line, full-throttle acceleration, the RL is capable of distributing 40% of torque to the rear wheels and 60% to the front wheels. In a hard turn, up to 100% of the rear wheel power can be distributed to the single, outer rear wheel. This action will push the rear around the corner, reducing understeer and keeping the car balanced and controlled. The effect can be likened to steering in a row boat where applying more power to one oar can turn the boat.

The SH-AWD all-wheel-drive system was lauded by Popular Science as one of the best automotive innovations of 2004, and as part of an already tech-filled vehicle helped to earn the 2005 "Tech car of the year" from CNET.com.

Honda has since announced an evolution of SH-AWD using hybrid electric technology. In a 2012 announcement, Sport Hybrid SH-AWD replaces the engine powered mechanical drive shaft and clutch packs by two, 27 horsepower electric motors, one on each wheel, not driven by the gasoline engine. The first two announced applications of the Sport Hybrid SH-AWD are to be on the rear wheels of the 2014 Acura RLX, and on the front wheels of the second generation Acura NSX.

Development 
On a very basic level, the SH-AWD system is combination of the Honda Variable Torque Management 4WD (VTM-4) automatic all-wheel-drive system and the Active Torque Transfer System (ATTS) variable torque distribution system. Honda introduced the ATTS technology in the 1997 Honda Prelude Type SH. Honda introduced the VTM- automatic all-wheel-drive system in late 2000 on the 2001 model year Acura MDX sport utility vehicle (SUV) and later on the 2003 Honda Pilot SUV.

The VTM-4 system claimed to be different from other all-wheel-drive systems in that it "anticipated" wheel slippage, rather than waiting for the vehicle to sense wheel slippage, when the vehicle may already be in trouble. The VTM-4 system consisted of a pair of computer-controlled wet clutches in the rear axle that worked in concert with the front wheels regardless of road conditions. On start-up, the VTM-4 system would send torque (power) from the front wheels to the rear wheels to supplement the normal front-wheel drive mode.  With all four wheels being powered on start-up, regardless of conditions, more tire adhesion is provided from four driving wheels rather than two front driving wheels. In the dry, this served to reduce front-wheel drive torque steer, and provide more front tire adhesion for cornering. In the wet, snow or mud, power to the rear wheels moves the vehicle from rest with a minimum of wheelspin because all four tires are working together to move the car, rather than just two front tires. VTM-4 was designed with a special lock mode to assist when a vehicle is stuck in the snow. This lock mode automatically engaged power to all four wheels at low speeds. As speeds increased, the power to the rear wheel would decrease, and by 18 mph, the system would revert to front-wheel drive.

SH-AWD combined both the automatic all-wheel drive VTM-4 system capability with the "super handling" torque shifting ability of ATTS on the rear axles.

In the North American market, Honda introduced the original SH-AWD system in late 2004 with the second generation 2005 Acura RL. Two other SH-AWD variants were introduced in late 2006 in the then all-new 2007 Acura RDX, and the new second generation 2007 Acura MDX sport utility vehicles. In late 2008, an improved version of the Acura RL SH-AWD was introduced in the significantly revised Mid-Model Change (MMC) of the 2009 Acura RL. This improved version provided earlier SH-AWD intervention (first gear vs second), and more precise use of the rear differential electromagnetic clutch system.

Yet another version of SH-AWD was introduced in late 2008 with the fourth generation 2009 Acura TL. The Acura TL implementation of SH-AWD is actually mechanically more similar to the SH-AWD layout in the Acura MDX and RDX in that the rear differential is over driven at a constant 1.7% faster than the front wheels, unlike the Acura RL, which, since its introduction in 2004, added an acceleration device which can over drive the rear wheels up to 5.7% faster than the front wheels.

As of 2010, the Acura RL remains the only SH-AWD configuration with the variable speed rear differential acceleration device. The newly introduced 2010 Acura ZDX four-door sports coupe maintains a mechanically similar fixed 1.7% over driven rear differential configuration to the other Acura SH-AWD equipped vehicles.

Acura announced in late 2008 that the 2010 Acura TL SH-AWD would be implemented with a six-speed manual transmission. Previous implementations of SH-AWD had all been with five-speed automatic transmissions.

On July 20, 2009, Acura announced the Acura ZDX four-door sports coupe, equipped with a new six-speed automatic transmission and SH-AWD. This would be the first time a six-speed automatic transmission would be mated to SH-AWD, as well as being the first six-speed automatic transmission introduced in either the Acura or Honda line up.

One week later, Acura announced a similar six-speed automatic transmission and SH-AWD with the 2010 Mid Model Change (MMC) refresh for the second generation Acura MDX.

In December 2010, the 2011 Acura RL was announced  with a second Mid Model Change, featuring, among other things, a six-speed automatic transmission.

On November 30, 2011, as part of the publicity surrounding the 2011 Tokyo Auto Show, Honda announced a new implementation of SH-AWD as part of its "Earth Dreams Technology". The new hybrid electric SH-AWD would be based on an all new 3.5 L V-6 alongside three electric motors and lithium-ion battery technology. The V-6 would be mated to a 30 kW electric motor which could operate independently of the V-6, unlike earlier mild hybrid Honda IMA configurations. In addition, each rear wheel would have a 20 kW electric motor that would operate independently, varying torque as conditions demand. On a turn, the electric motor would apply torque to the outside rear wheel, while the inside rear wheel motor would drag, amplifying the SH-AWD effect. At the same time, the dragging motor would act as a generator, feeding power to the outside wheel motor. If the lithium ion pack became depleted, the V-6 would power the front electric motor as generator to feed electricity to rear wheels while also charging the battery. A prototype of this system was shown in a test mule using an 8th generation North American version of the Honda Accord.

Function 

Current SH-AWD configurations are all mated to a transverse engine, either a turbo-charged in-line four-cylinder Honda K-Series engine in the case of the RDX, or naturally aspirated V-6 versions of the Honda J-Series engine. The engines are mated to a front-wheel-drive transaxle without a center differential. The transaxle is bolted to torque transfer unit that spins a center drive shaft that powers the rear differential unit. The rear differential is a T-shaped device. Power coming from the engine is transferred via a central hypoid gear that delivers power to each rear axle. Power to each axle is modulated by identical planetary gear sets and electromagnetic clutch packs which can vary incoming power side to side.

As previously described, SH-AWD can vary torque side to side through the rear wheels. This ability to drive one of the rear wheels with more power is accomplished through overdriving the rear wheels with respect to the front wheels. The Acura RL is designed with a third planetary gear set and clutch pack that are packaged into a so-called "Acceleration Device", which is bolted in front of the rear differential unit. The Acceleration Device allows torque to be passed to the rear wheels at a near one to one ratio, but in cornering situations, the Acceleration Device variably increases the torque passed to the rear up to 5%, depending on the cornering situation.

As of early 2010, SH-AWD has been implemented by Acura in two functionally similar, but mechanically different configurations, with and without Acceleration Device. The more complex SH-AWD version uses the Acceleration Device and can be found in:

2005–2008 Acura RL Sedan
2009–2010 Mid-Model Change Acura RL Sedan
2011–2012 Mid-Model Change Acura RL Sedan

The less complex version of SH-AWD omits the Acceleration Device and can be found in:

2007–2012;2019-TBD Acura RDX CUV
2007–TBD Acura MDX SUV
2009–2014 Acura TL SH-AWD Sedan
2010–2013 Acura ZDX SH-AWD Four-Door Sports Coupe
2015–TBD Acura TLX SH-AWD Sedan

The Acceleration Device allows the rear wheels to be variably overdriven with respect to the speed of the front wheels up to 5.7%. The Acceleration Device in the Acura RL is positioned in front of the rear differential. During normal steady state driving, the Acceleration Device input shaft (from the engine) and output shaft (to the rear differential) spin at almost equal speeds. In a cornering situation, the output shaft spins up to 5.7% faster than the input shaft, effectively speeding up the rear wheels. The electromagnetic clutch packs, based on sensor inputs, will vary the torque sent to the rear differential from side to side providing constant and dynamic balancing of the car handling characteristics.

The SH-AWD configuration with no acceleration device overdrives the rear wheels at a constant 1.7% with respect to the speed of the front wheels.

The Acceleration Device was first introduced in the flagship Acura RL sedan, and continues in the MMC versions of the Acura RL sedan. This more complex configuration appears to be unique among Acura vehicles equipped SH-AWD. This more complex RL configuration could be considered an exclusive flagship vehicle feature, and not specified for vehicles with lower price points. On the other hand, the later SH-AWD configuration without the Acceleration Device could just be a simpler and less sophisticated version due to vehicle dynamics and price points, or it could represent a more refined, less complex and inherently more reliable, new standard for the SH-AWD configuration. The rationale for the two distinct configurations has not been publicized by Acura.

SH-AWD in the Acura RDX and Acura MDX uses a default power split of 90% to the front and 10% to the rear. Like the unit in the RL, both can power the rear wheels with various amounts engine torque. The power split under straight-line, high-speed acceleration varies from vehicle to vehicle. In addition, in cornering situations, dependent on the specific vehicle balance and dynamics, the rearward power transfer ratios in the RDX and MDX differ greatly from the RL and TL sedans.

For example, in comparing the RL to the MDX, in hard cornering, the most power transferred to the rear wheels for the RL is 70%, whereas the MDX is only 50%. In straight line efficient cruising, different model years of the RL can transfer from 70 to 80% to the front wheels, while the MDX can transfer as much as 90% to the front wheels.

SH-AWD differs in function from other popular all-wheel drive systems, like Audi’s popular Quattro. For example, when it comes to torque distribution, SH-AWD is front-biased (with the exception of the performance oriented UB5 TLX Type S) but Audi's Quattro is rear-biased. SH-AWD is already a torque vectoring system but Audi requires two different packages (Dynamic and Dynamic Plus) in order for Quattro to be a torque vectoring system.

Systems integration

SH-AWD technology is deeply integrated with other systems and sensors implemented in Acura vehicles including:

3 or 4 channel (model dependent) Anti-lock Braking System (ABS)
4 channel Vehicle Stability Assist (VSA)
Electronic Brake Force Distribution (EBD)
Throttle control system
Yaw Angle Sensor
Speed sensor
Steering Angle sensor
Lateral G-Force sensor

These systems and sensors all work together to enhance vehicle handling, and safety.

Implementation

Acura RL

The second generation Acura RL sedan, introduced in late 2004 as a 2005 model, was the first production implementation of SH-AWD. It is the most mechanically complex, and probably the heaviest implementation of SH-AWD. This RL is powered by either a 3.5L 290 horsepower VTEC (variable valve timing and lift) V-6 (2005–2008), or a 3.7L 300 horsepower VTEC V-6 (2009–2010) transverse mounted in the manner of a typical Honda front-wheel-drive car. In fact, the RL uses a highly modified version of the Honda Global Midsize platform, versions of which exist for the Honda Accord, Acura TSX and Acura TL. However, the front transaxle is directly coupled to a torque transfer unit. Two identical clutch/planetary gearsets power each rear wheel. The rear wheels are always overdriven with respect to the speed of the front wheels. The Acceleration Device can variably overdrive the rear wheel speed up to 5.7%.

The 2005 and 2006 system normally sends 70% of power to the front wheels and 30% to the rear under normal conditions but these ratios can reverse according to dynamic driving conditions. The 2007–2008 brochure specification sections indicate that this ratio changed to 80%-20%, and vice versa. The system works because the clutches can slip under circumstances where the vehicle is turning, thus allowing the rear and front wheels to turn at different rates around a curve. As noted above, the SH-AWD can take 100% of the power shunted through the rear differentials and variably direct power to each wheel, up to 100% of that power to the outside rear wheel. Adding power to the outside rear wheel on a turn has a steering effect on the vehicle which can greatly improve vehicle handling dynamics through the reduction of oversteer and more balanced handling. In limited situations, the vehicle may exhibit power oversteer, a characteristic of sportier rear-wheel-drive vehicles.

While the rear differential also acts like a limited slip differential in spirited driving, SH-AWD is deeply integrated into the Honda Vehicle Stability Assist (VSA) system and various onboard sensors which helps to keep the car under control in a variety of situations.

The 2009 RL was updated to have more aggressive intervention of SH-AWD to give the car more rear-wheel-drive-like handling characteristics.

Acura RDXThe Acura RDX was introduced in mid-2006 as a 2007 model year car. The first generation Acura RDX is a small crossover utility vehicle, and features a simpler implementation of SH-AWD than that found in the RL. The RDX does not have the Acceleration Device found in the Acura RL; instead the rear wheels are constantly overdriven at 1.7% higher speed than the front wheels. The RDX is distinguished by a unique 2.3L turbo charged 240 horsepower inline four-cylinder VTEC engine mounted in what is purported to be a unique version of the Honda Global Small Light Truck Platform, a version different from the platform used for the same-generation Honda CR-V and Honda Element. The engine is also transversely mounted.

Acura MDXThe second generation Acura MDX, introduced in late 2006 as a 2007 model, uses a simpler implementation of SH-AWD than that found in the RL, the main difference is that unlike the RL 70% front/30% rear torque distribution, the MDX offers the opposite, having a 30% front/70% rear torque distribution. The MDX configuration is similar to that in the RDX in that there is no Acceleration Device as found in the RL. The rear wheels are constantly overdriven at 1.7% faster speed than the front wheels. The MDX is powered by a 3.7L 300 horsepower VTEC V-6 engine transversely mounted in a version of the Honda Global Large Light Truck Platform, versions of which are used for the Honda Pilot, Honda Ridgeline, Honda Odyssey, and the 2010 Acura ZDX. As can be seen below, the vehicle dynamics of the Acura MDX require different operating parameters.

Acura TLThe fourth generation Acura TL, introduced in late 2008 as a 2009 model has two major trim levels, a front-wheel-drive version, and an upmarket SH-AWD version. Similar in layout to the Acura RL, the Acura SH-AWD TL features a 3.7L 305 horsepower VTEC V-6, transversely mounted front engine in the Global Midsize Platform. The 2009 model uses a five-speed automatic transmission, but Acura has also promised a new six-speed manual transmission for the 2010 model year. It remains to be seen if the 2010 model will also feature the newly announced six-speed automatic transmission featured in the prototype Acura ZDX announced at the April 2009 New York Auto Show. Unlike the Acura RL, the SH-AWD TL does not have the Acceleration Device.

Acura TLXThe Acura TLX was introduced in April 2014 at the New York International Auto Show.

Acura ZDXThe first generation Acura ZDX was announced on April 8, 2009 at the New York Auto Show as a 2010 model, slated for introduction in late Fall 2009 as an all new prototype concept car, billed as a luxury four-door sports coupe. The Acura ZDX went on sale December 15, 2009. The car is powered by an all-aluminum 3.7L 300 horsepower, 270 lbs-ft torque VTEC V-6, mated to an all-new 6-speed automatic transmission with Sequential SportShift and Super Handling All-Wheel Drive. The V-6 appears to be mechanically similar to the Acura MDX V-6. The Acura ZDX SH-AWD implementation description appears to be very similar to the Acura MDX SH-AWD implementation.

See also
 4Matic - a four-wheel-drive system from Mercedes-Benz
 ATTESA - a four-wheel-drive system from Nissan
 xDrive - a four-wheel drive for BMW
 Quattro (four-wheel-drive system) - a four-wheel-drive system from Audi
 S-AWC - a four-wheel-drive system from Mitsubishi Motors
 Saab XWD - a four-wheel-drive system from Saab
 4motion - a four-wheel-drive system from Volkswagen
 All-Trac - a four-wheel-drive system from Toyota
 Symmetrical All Wheel Drive - the four wheel drive system from Subaru

References

External links 
 http://www.acura.com/index.aspx?initPath=RDX_Learn_FeaturesOptions_Performance_SHAWD_SHAWDOverview

Honda
Acura
Four-wheel-drive system tradenames